Katherine Vaz (born August 26, 1955) is an American writer. A Briggs-Copeland Fellow in Fiction at Harvard University (2003–9), a 2006–7 Fellow of the Radcliffe Institute for Advanced Study, and the Fall, 2012 Harman Fellow at Baruch College in New York, she is the author of the critically acclaimed novel Saudade (St. Martin’s Press, 1994), the first contemporary novel about Portuguese-Americans from a major New York publisher. It was optioned by Marlee Matlin/Solo One Productions and selected in the Barnes & Nobles Discover Great New Writers series.

Her second novel, Mariana, (HarperCollins, 1997), was selected by the Library of Congress as one of the Top 30 International Books of 1998 and has been translated into six languages.

Vaz's  first short story collection Fado & Other Stories received the 1997 Drue Heinz Literature Prize and her second collection, Our Lady of the Artichokes, won the 2007 Prairie Schooner Book Prize.

Vaz is a recipient of a Literature Fellowship from the National Endowment for the Arts (1993)  and the Davis Humanities Institute Fellowship (1999). She has been named by the Luso-Americano as one of the Top 50 Luso-Americanos of the twentieth century  and is the first Portuguese-American to have her work recorded for the Library of Congress, housed in the Hispanic Division. The Portuguese-American Women’s Association (PAWA) named her 2003 Woman of the Year.  She was appointed to the six-person U.S. Presidential Delegation to open the American Pavilion at the World’s Fair/Expo 98 in Lisbon. She lives in New York City and the Springs area of East Hampton with Christopher Cerf, whom she married in July, 2015.

Awards
1997: Drue Heinz Literature Prize, Fado & Other Stories 
2007: Prairie Schooner Book Prize, ""

Published works

Novels
Saudade (St. Martin’s Press, June 1994)
Mariana (HarperCollins/Flamingo, 1997)

Story collections
Fado & Other Stories (University of Pittsburgh Press, 1997)
Lady of the Artichokes and Other Portuguese-American Stories (University of Nebraska Press, 2008);

Short stories

"I Can’t Keep Anything Nice in This House" (Descant, Fort Worth, TX, Fall/Winter 1986)
"What I Did on My Christmas Vacation" (Proof Rock, Halifax, VA, Winter 1988)
"Original Sin" (Black Ice, Belmont, MA, 1988)
"A Little Irish Water Music" (The Sun, March 1988)
"Sostenuto" (Kalliope, Jacksonville, FL, February 1988)
"Fado" (TriQuarterly, Fall 1989) 
"Cartooning is Dead" (Primavera, Ann Arbor, MI, 1989)
"Add Blue to Make White Whiter" (Other Voices, Summer/Fall 1990)
"Red Tide" (Webster Review, Webster Groves, MO, Spring 1991)
"Still Life" (The American Voice, Louisville, KY, 1993)
"Scalings" (The Gettysburg Review, Spring 1995)
"The Birth of Water Stories" (Speak, San Francisco, CA, October 1996)
"Island Fever" (Nimrod, Tulsa, OK, Fall/Winter 1996)
"The Lost Love Letter of a Nun" (Madame Class Magazine, Milan, Italy, August 1997)
"Michigan Girl" (The Iowa Review, December 2000)
"Utter" (The Malahat Review, Fall 2000)
"The Man Who Was Made of Netting" (Tin House, January 2001)
"My Family, Posing for Rodin" (The Antioch Review, Summer 2001)
"Taking a Stitch in a Dead Man’s Arm" (BOMB, Winter 2001)

"Blue Flamingo Looks At Red Water" (The Sun May, 2002)
"The Glass-Eaters" (Glimmer Train, Fall 2002)
"Bébé Marie Springs from the Box" (ACM (Another Chicago Magazine), Fall 2002)
"Annette Kellermann Is My Hero" (The Alaska Quarterly Review, Spring 2003)
"Pavane for a Dead Princess" (Kalliope, Spring 2003)
"the rice artist" (The Iowa Review, August 2003)
"Burning Sailor Boy" (Provincetown Arts, Summer 2003)
"Our Lady of the Artichokes" (Pleiades, Fall 2003)
"The Love Life of an Assistant Animator" (Glimmer Train, Fall 2003)
"A Simple Affair" (Gargoyle Magazine, May 2004)
"The Knife Longs for the Ruby" (Ninth Letter, Spring 2004)
"Our Bones Here Are Waiting for Yours" (Five Points, 2004)
"East Bay Grease" (The Antioch Review, Summer 2004)
"One Must Speak of Sex in French" (Confrontation, Fall 2004/Winter 2005)
"All Riptides Roar with Sand from Opposing Shores" (Notre Dame Review, Winter 2006)
"Lisbon Story" (Harvard Review, Spring 2006)

Non-fiction
"Songs of the Soul, Songs of the Night," The New York Times, Sophisticated Traveler Magazine, September 18, 1994
Signatures of Grace (Dutton, 2000).  Essay on Baptism.  (In conjunction with Mary Gordon, Andre Dubus, Patricia Hampl, Ron Hansen, Paula Huston, Paul Mariani).
"Carving the Fruitstones," for anthology about short fiction, 2004, Greenwood Publications.
"This Howling," essay on the Azores/introduction to novel by João de Melo (My World Is Not of This Kingdom, translated from Portuguese by Gregory Rabassa), Aliform Press, 2003.

Children's literature
"The Kingdom of Melting Glances" short story in A Wolf at the Door (Simon & Schuster, 2000, in fourth printing)
"A World Painted by Birds" in Green Man anthology (Viking, 2002)
"My Swan Sister," title story in Swan Sister and Other Stories (Simon & Schuster, 2003)
"Your Garnet Eyes,"in anthology Faery Reel, (Viking, 2004)
"Chamber Music for Animals," in Coyote Road anthology (Viking, 2006)

Footnotes

1955 births
Writers from the San Francisco Bay Area
American people of Portuguese descent
Living people
People from Castro Valley, California